A steam trap is a device used to discharge condensates and non-condensable gases with a negligible consumption or loss of live steam. Steam traps are nothing more than automatic valves. They open, close or modulate automatically. The three important functions of steam traps are:
 Discharge condensate as soon as it is formed (unless it is desirable to use the sensible heat of the liquid condensate) 
 Have a negligible steam consumption (i.e. be energy efficient)
 Have the capability of discharging air and other non-condensable gases.

Basic operation

The operation of a steam trap depends on the difference in properties between steam and condensate. Since liquid condensate has a much higher density than gaseous steam, it will tend to accumulate at the lowest possible point in the steam system. Steam properties such as density, latent heat, and saturation/boiling point are affected by pressure.

Steam traps can be split into three main categories; Mechanical, Thermodynamic, and Thermostatic. Each type uses a different operating principle to remove condensate and non-condensable gases and keep steam in the system. The vast majority of steam traps in current operation are of the mechanical operated design.

Steam traps are sized for specific applications based on amount of condensate they can remove, as well as other factors such as the ability to remove air and non-condensable gases.

Types
Steam traps can be split into three major types:

 Mechanical traps. These remove condensate through the use of the mechanical properties of steam vs condensate. Since liquid is denser than the steam it will travel to the bottom of the system. Mechanical traps will have a bucket or float that rises and falls in relation to condensate level and this usually has a mechanical linkage attached that opens and closes the valve. Mechanical traps operate in direct relationship to condensate levels present in the body of the steam trap. Inverted bucket and float traps are examples of mechanical traps. Float traps can have a mechanical linkage or can seal the trap through use of the float itself.
 Thermostatic traps. These remove condensate through the temperature difference of steam vs the liquid phase. The valve is driven through expansion and contraction of an element that is exposed to the heat from steam or condensate. These traps take a temperature drop below the saturation curve to open and remove condensate. These traps can perform this by a filled element or bellows or bimetallic element.
 Thermodynamic traps. These operate on the dynamic principals of steam vs condensate and the use of Bernoulli’s principle. When condensate released through an orifice the speed increases and a pressure drop occurs. This will flash steam to create higher pressure to close a valve (disc) or slow the discharge speed of the trap. The main types of traps in this family are; Disc, Impulse, Labyrinth, Orifice (or Venturi Nozzle).

Performance assessment of steam traps

There are basically three methods for the performance assessment of steam traps.
 Visual method. This method basically involves visual inspection requiring good observational skills. The person assessing the trap must be able to clearly distinguish between flash steam and live steam. Sight glasses can be used for assessment.
 Sound method. The mechanisms involved in the operation of steam traps generate sounds of sonic and supersonic frequencies. Wielding proper auditory equipment along with the knowledge of Normal and abnormal sounds can help in efficient assessment of steam traps.
 Temperature method. This method is the least reliable of all the assessment methods. The low reliability of this method rests on the fact that the temperature of the condensate and saturated steam are approximately the same causing difficulties to distinguish between them on temperature basis. Some methods like cold trap are available for temperature assessment. The cold trap denotes the existence of large amount of condensates which condensed during steam trap operation. Hence required action may be taken for the same.

References

External links
STEAM MANUAL - "Steam Traps Manual" by V. Blazquez (Aeronautical Engineer).
Steam Trapping Guide - Emerson
Steam Basics - Armstrong International, Inc.
Steam Trap Types - US Department of Energy Federal Energy Management Program

Plumbing valves